Schinia acutilinea, the angled gem or acute-lined flower moth, is a moth of the family Noctuidae. The species was first described by Augustus Radcliffe Grote in 1878. It is found in the dry southern portions of Saskatchewan, Alberta and British Columbia, south across the plains and Great Basin to southern Arizona and California.

The wingspan is 25–27 mm. Adults are on wing in August.

The larvae feed on Artemisia species, including Artemisia tridentata and Artemisia nova.

Schinia acutilinea was placed as a synonym of Schinia accessa by David F. Hardwick in 1996, but recent research by Michael G. Pogue indicates several species are included under this name.

References

Schinia
Moths of North America
Moths described in 1878

Taxa named by Augustus Radcliffe Grote